The Only Way Is Essex (often abbreviated as TOWIE ) is a British reality television series based in Brentwood, Essex, England. It shows "real people in modified situations, saying unscripted lines but in a structured way." Originally broadcast on ITV2 from 2010, the series was moved to ITVBe in October 2014. The first series consisted of 10 episodes and ran for 30 minutes, with a Christmas special following later in the year. Due to popularity, the runtime was extended to 45-minute episodes and renewed for a year's airing. On 22 May 2011, the series won the Audience Award at the 2011 BAFTA Awards.

On 13 March 2016, ITVBe aired a one-off documentary hosted by former cast member Mark Wright, discussing the history of the series. On 28 February 2017, with the announcement of the cast for the show's twentieth series, it was confirmed that instead of the usual three series per year, ITVBe would only be airing two series, but with more episodes.

Series

Cast

This is a list of main and supporting cast members currently appearing in the series. From series 1 to 3, the main cast received star billing in the opening credits and were credited by their first names.

Reception
The genre of "scripted reality" has attracted much criticism for a lack of authenticity, or indeed outright deception.

The show has been criticised for its negative and stereotypical representation of Essex, and there have been a number of complaints to ITV2. It contributed to the popularity of Essex girl jokes. Some Essex residents felt it was not a true representation of the area and the people who live there. Kirk Norcross responded to this criticism by saying, "We are all from Essex, so this is Essex. It's not acting. It's not like they've got people from America and said 'Right, act like you think you know where Essex is.' We are Essex people so what you're watching is Essex."

In April 2011, it was reported that Big Brother 8 winner Brian Belo intended to sue the makers of The Only Way Is Essex – claiming they "stole his idea". Belo was in the original pilot of the show – provisionally titled Totally Essex – alongside current stars Mark Wright, Sam Faiers, Kirk Norcross and Amy Childs. Belo planned to sue his former manager and Lime Productions, which makes the show, for lost earnings of up to £100,000 a series.

On 24 October 2011, it was reported that sisters Sam and Billie Faiers had been attacked by a group of girls on a night out in London: "The sisters were first targeted inside the club when the girls made off with Billie's handbag... When they left, the gang followed them back to Essex." An insider also commented saying "Both Sam and Billie later went to A&E to get checked out. They are fine now, just a bit shocked, although Sam has been left with two black eyes." A video of the attack leaked online a day later. The aftermath of the attack was aired during series 3 episode 10.

In May 2012, it was reported that original cast member Lauren Goodger had fallen out with the show's director for her bad timekeeping on set and her diva demands. Goodger appeared in the first four episodes of series 5, and was suspended from appearing in the show, however on 18 May 2012, it was confirmed that the issues had been resolved and that Goodger would be returning to the programme. She returned in episode 9 and her absence from the show was not mentioned on screen.

On 1 December 2012, it was reported that The X Factor finalist Rylan Clark would appear on the TOWIE Live special episode and later return as a full-time cast member in 2013. Mario Falcone reacted to the rumours by saying, "If he comes on Monday's live show, that's fine because it's all for charity, but if he comes on TOWIE as a main character, I'll leave. We hate him. He's a douche bag." Kirk Norcross commented, "I've met Rylan before and he's actually a really nice boy but when people think of Essex they just think of the abbreviation, the 'Shut-up', the 'Oh my god' - that was all Amy Childs and we don't want that." On 3 December, following Falcone and Norcross's comments, Clark pulled out of his one-off appearance for the live episode, later saying: "TOWIE's a great programme and I wish them all the best of luck, but I can’t do the show because I’ve got commitments to the X Factor tour and I’ve got to be in rehearsals. I’ve never met Mario in my life, so I find it very unprofessional and ungentlemanly for him to go around talking about people he hasn’t even met, Anyone who cheats on his girlfriend that much isn’t worth my time."

The live episode was called "an utter car crash" and "possibly the worst TV show ever".

Production
The show was initially filmed just a few days in advance and has been narrated by Denise van Outen since its inception. The first series ran for four weeks, airing every Wednesday and Sunday. The show has been described by the Daily Mirror as Britain's answer to The Hills and Jersey Shore. Series 2 began on 20 March 2011, once again airing every Wednesday and Sunday, but with longer episodes than Series 1. Series 2 also saw the departure of original cast member Amy Childs. The second series consisted of 14 episodes, ending on 4 May 2011. The series returned for a third series on 25 September 2011 and was the final series to feature two of the original cast members Mark Wright whose departure was seen in the final episode while Kirk Norcross departed off-screen like Childs. The series ended on 9 November 2011. On 2 December 2011, it was revealed that many of the cast would not be returning for the fourth series in 2012 but would feature in the 2011 Christmas Special. The fourth series began in January 2012.

Digital Spy reported that the series had been renewed for a further four series following the Christmas Special and would air four 10-episode runs in 2012.

On 20 March 2020, it was announced that filming for the forthcoming twenty-sixth series had been postponed due to the impact of the COVID-19 pandemic on television. ITV said the move was to ensure the "safety of the cast and crew". Whilst off air, it was announced that the show would return later in the air with an extended series for the show's 10th anniversary and would include the return of old cast members, as well as going back to two episodes per week. The show returned for its twenty-seventh series on 14 March 2021 where it once again reverted to just one episode per week. Despite filming for this series taking place during a national lockdown, some restaurants and pubs opened especially for the show.

Two months after the twenty-seventh series had aired, the production team announced that the cast would face an overhaul, with several cast members having been axed. They described the change as an evolution of the series and explained that it would allow for the remaining cast to be featured more. They also assured axed cast members that they would be able to receive welfare support from ITV if needed and thanked them for appearing on the series.

Music
In December 2011, the cast of the series released a cover of the Wham! song "Last Christmas", with their own version of the theme song "The Only Way Is Up" as the single's B-side. All profits from the single went to Text Santa.

Singles

The Only Way Is Marbs – Marbella Sessions
The Only Way Is Marbs – Marbella Sessions is a 61-song compilation album released 23 June 2014 to coincide with the start of series 12 which saw the return of The Only Way Is Marbs. The album is mixed by Lauren Pope.

The Only Way Is Essex – Dance Anthems
The Only Way Is Essex – Dance Anthems is a 61-song compilation album released on 13 October 2014. The album is the second to be mixed by Lauren Pope.

DVD releases

References

External links

 
 

 
2010s British reality television series
2020s British reality television series
2010 British television series debuts
BAFTA winners (television series)
Culture in Essex
ITV reality television shows
Television shows set in Essex
Television shows set in London
English-language television shows
Television series by All3Media